Biscoe is a town in Montgomery County, North Carolina, United States. The population was 1,700 at the 2010 census.  The town is named after Henry Biscoe, an important customer of the local lumber business.

History 

The area was formerly called "Filo."  The current name was adopted in 1895.

Biscoe's past was dependent on the railroad industry, and it was once an important repair center for railroad equipment.
The Aberdeen and West End Railroad (owned by the Page family of Aberdeen, North Carolina) completed a branch to Star, North Carolina from Filo, NC (current Biscoe) in 1895. The A & W. E. R.R. was merged into the Aberdeen and Asheboro Railroad in 1897.

Biscoe was incorporated in 1901.

Notable person

Former U.S. Congressman Larry Kissell is a resident of Biscoe.

Geography
Biscoe is located at  (35.360450, -79.780278).

U.S. 220, I-73/74 and N.C. 24/27 all pass through Biscoe.

Demographics

2020 census

As of the 2020 United States census, there were 1,848 people, 600 households, and 498 families residing in the town.

2000 census
As of the census of 2000, there were 1,700 people, 535 households, and 393 families residing in the town. The population density was 855.8 people per square mile (329.8/km2). There were 572 housing units at an average density of 287.9 per square mile (111.0/km2). The racial makeup of the town was 58.35% White, 24.47% African American, 0.35% Native American, 0.59% Asian, 15.47% from other races, and 0.76% from two or more races. Hispanic or Latino of any race were 23.24% of the population.

There were 535 households, out of which 38.7% had children under the age of 18 living with them, 52.9% were married couples living together, 14.6% had a female householder with no husband present, and 26.4% were non-families. 21.7% of all households were made up of individuals, and 9.7% had someone living alone who was 65 years of age or older. The average household size was 2.97 and the average family size was 3.42.

In the town, the population was spread out, with 28.6% under the age of 18, 11.2% from 18 to 24, 25.6% from 25 to 44, 19.5% from 45 to 64, and 15.1% who were 65 years of age or older. The median age was 34 years. For every 100 females, there were 92.7 males. For every 100 females age 18 and over, there were 87.3 males.

The median income for a household in the town was $35,667, and the median income for a family was $37,500. Males had a median income of $23,214 versus $21,089 for females. The per capita income for the town was $15,302. About 8.5% of families and 11.8% of the population were below the poverty line, including 16.4% of those under age 18 and 6.7% of those age 65 or over.

References

External links
 Official Biscoe, NC web site

Towns in North Carolina
Towns in Montgomery County, North Carolina
Populated places established in 1895
1895 establishments in North Carolina